The Sliprännor i Gantofta are stone carvings located near the village of Gantofta at  Helsingborg Municipality   in Scania,  Sweden. They  are situated on the escarpment of the Råå river valley (Rååns dalgång) in a sandstone outcrop.

History
Traditionally, they were held to be grooves produced by people sharpening knives and axes, like numerous straight grooves in Gotland. However, modern surveys of the concave horizontal grooves may indicate that they were created by means of a pendulum motion or a rotating wheel. Today it is believed that the concave grooves in particular (and possibly also the straight ones) are the remains of ritual with religious or magical significance. Grooves are particularly common in the northwest of Scania, especially on the Kullen peninsula, Gotland and Östergötland. Traces of the Stone Age Pitted Ware culture (c. 3200-2600 BC) are also common in these areas. However, there is as yet no certain evidence that the grooves were made during the Stone Age.

See also 
 Gantoftadösen

References

Other sources 
 

Gantofta
Gantofta
Helsingborg